Gena Löfstrand (born 23 October 1995) is a South African middle-distance runner. She represented her country in the 800 metres at the 2017 World Championships reaching the semifinals.

International competitions

Personal bests

Outdoor
200 metres – 25.17 (+0.4 m/s, Pretoria 2017)
400 metres – 53.81 (Pretoria 2017)
600 metres – 1:28.32 (Pretoria 2017)
800 metres – 2:01.50 (Luzern 2017)
1500 metres – 4:28.94 (Potchefstroom 2016)

References

1995 births
Living people
South African female middle-distance runners
World Athletics Championships athletes for South Africa